9th district of Czech senate is based in Plzeň. Lumír Aschenbrenner is the current Senator.

Senators

References

9
Elections in Plzeň